Douglas Hill (born 16 January 1985) is a Scottish footballer who plays as a defender for Scottish league 2 side Kelty Hearts.
At the start of the 2022/2023 season Hill took on the role as assistant manager while playing when required at Kelty Hearts.

He has previously played for Alloa Athletic, Cowdenbeath, Raith Rovers, Dumbarton and Brechin City.

Career
Hill started his career in the youth side of Falkirk and in July 2004, signed for Alloa Athletic After one season at Alloa, Hill signed for Cowdenbeath in July 2005. On 17 June 2008, Hill signed for Alloa Athletic for a second time. On 17 July 2009, Hill signed for Raith Rovers. He made his debut on 8 August 2009, as a substitute against Queen of The South in the Scottish First Division. He went on to score his first goal and the winning goal for the club in their game against Ross County on 22 August 2009. In all he made 33 appearances scoring two goals that season.

At the start of the 2010–11 season, Hill suffered a broken ankle in the Reserve League Cup Final against Dunfermline Athletic. On his return from injury, in order to regain full fitness, he went out on loan to Brechin City. He made his debut on 29 January 2011, in a 2–1 win against Dumbarton scoring the opening goal. In all he made five appearances for Brechin but unfortunately was sent off in his last game for the club. On his return to Raith Rovers, Hill broke back into the first team making a further eight appearances for them.

On 6 April 2014, Hill was named man of the match in a 1–0 win against Rangers in the 2014 Scottish Challenge Cup Final. In June 2015, after six-years with the Kirkcaldy side, Hill was released by Raith Rovers. On 22 June 2015, Hill signed for a third spell with Scottish Championship club Alloa Athletic. After one season at Recreation Park, Hill moved to Scottish League One side Brechin City in June 2016, who he previously had a short spell on loan with in 2011. After achieving promotion to the Scottish Championship, Hill was one of a number of players who were released by Brechin.

Following a successful trial, Hill joined Scottish Championship side Dumbarton on a one-year deal in July 2017. He scored his first goal for the club in a Playoff semi-final victory against Arbroath in May 2018. He left Dumbarton in May 2018, following the expiration of his contract, and rejoined Brechin City.

Hill signed with Kelty Hearts on 10 September 2020.

Career statistics

Honours

Club
Raith Rovers
Scottish Challenge Cup: 2013–14

References

External links
 (Alloa 1st/3rd spells & Cowdenbeath)
 (Cowdenbeath 2006–07)
 (Alloa 2nd spell)
 (Raith Rovers & Brechin)

1985 births
Footballers from Edinburgh
Living people
Scottish Football League players
Raith Rovers F.C. players
Brechin City F.C. players
Scottish footballers
Association football defenders
Alloa Athletic F.C. players
Cowdenbeath F.C. players
Falkirk F.C. players
Scottish Professional Football League players
Dumbarton F.C. players
Kelty Hearts F.C. players